Lamprocystis is a genus of small air-breathing land snails, terrestrial pulmonate gastropod mollusks in the subfamily Microcystinae in the family Euconulidae, the hive snails.

Species 
Species within the genus Lamprocystis include:

 Lamprocystis alba (Möllendorff, 1887)
 Lamprocystis arctispira Quadras & Möllendorff, 1894
 Lamprocystis badia Möllendorff, 1890
 Lamprocystis batudulangensis B. Rensch, 1930
 Lamprocystis calamianica Quadras & Möllendorff, 1894
 Lamprocystis candida Quadras & Möllendorff, 1894
 Lamprocystis castaneovitrina B. Rensch, 1932
 Lamprocystis chlororaphe E. A. Smith, 1893
 Lamprocystis consueta (E. A. Smith, 1896)
 Lamprocystis conulina Möllendorff, 1891
 Lamprocystis crystallina (Möllendorff, 1887)
 Lamprocystis ctenodonta B. Rensch, 1935
 Lamprocystis cursor P. Sarasin & F. Sarasin, 1899
 Lamprocystis denticulata Quadras & Möllendorff, 1894
 Lamprocystis discoidea Quadras & Möllendorff, 1894
 Lamprocystis ensifera (Mousson, 1869)
 Lamprocystis excrescens (Mousson, 1870)
 Lamprocystis fastigata  (Gude, 1917)
 Lamprocystis gedeana Möllendorff, 1897
 Lamprocystis gemmula (Möllendorff, 1887)
 Lamprocystis glaberrima (C. Semper, 1870)
 Lamprocystis globosa H. B. Baker, 1938
 Lamprocystis globulus (Möllendorff, 1887)
 Lamprocystis goniogyra Möllendorff, 1888
 Lamprocystis guttula (L. Pfeiffer, 1853)
 Lamprocystis hahajimana (Pilsbry, 1902)
 Lamprocystis hornbosteli H. B. Baker, 1938
 Lamprocystis imitatrix Möllendorff, 1890
 Lamprocystis infans (L. Pfeiffer, 1854)
 Lamprocystis kioaensis (Garrett, 1873)
 Lamprocystis laciniata B. Rensch, 1930
 Lamprocystis lactea (C. Semper, 1870)
 Lamprocystis laddi H. B. Baker, 1938
 Lamprocystis leucochondrium Möllendorff, 1896
 Lamprocystis leucoclimax Möllendorff, 1895
 Lamprocystis leucodiscus Möllendorff, 1894
 Lamprocystis leucosphaerion Quadras & Möllendorff, 1893
 Lamprocystis lucidella (L. Pfeiffer, 1846)
 Lamprocystis mabelae (E. A. Smith, 1888)
 Lamprocystis macassarica P. Sarasin & F. Sarasin, 1899
 Lamprocystis malayana Möllendorff, 1891
 Lamprocystis masbatica Quadras & Möllendorff, 1895
 Lamprocystis mendanae Solem, 1959
 Lamprocystis mildredae (E. A. Smith, 1888)
 Lamprocystis mindoroana Quadras & Möllendorff, 1894
 Lamprocystis misella (Férussac, 1821)
 Lamprocystis mitangensis P. Sarasin & F. Sarasin, 1899
 Lamprocystis moalana H. B. Baker, 1938
 Lamprocystis montana Quadras & Möllendorff, 1895
 Lamprocystis musicola P. Sarasin & F. Sarasin, 1899
 Lamprocystis myops (Dohrn & C. Semper, 1862)
 Lamprocystis nodulata (Mousson, 1870)
 Lamprocystis normani (E. A. Smith, 1888)
 Lamprocystis oneataensis (Mousson, 1870)
 Lamprocystis ongeae H. B. Baker, 1938
 Lamprocystis perglabra (E. A. Smith, 1898)
 Lamprocystis perpolita (Mousson, 1869)
 Lamprocystis planorbis Möllendorff, 1894
 Lamprocystis punctifera (Garrett, 1879)
 Lamprocystis purpureofusca Quadras & Möllendorff, 1895
 Lamprocystis rurutuana H. B. Baker, 1938
 Lamprocystis semiglobulus (Möllendorff, 1887)
 Lamprocystis simillima (Pease, 1864)
 Lamprocystis sinica (Möllendorff, 1885)
 Lamprocystis solida (Mousson, 1871)
 Lamprocystis soputensis P. Sarasin & F. Sarasin, 1899
 Lamprocystis subglobulus Möllendorff, 1891
 Lamprocystis timorensis B. Rensch, 1935
 Lamprocystis unisulcata (Mousson, 1865)
 Lamprocystis upolensis (Mousson, 1865)
 Lamprocystis vavauensis (Baird, 1873)
 Lamprocystis venosa (Pease, 1866)
 Lamprocystis vestalis van Benthem Jutting, 1964
 Lamprocystis vitrinella (Beck, 1838)
 Lamprocystis vitrinoconulus B. Rensch, 1935
 Lamprocystis waingapuensis B. Rensch, 1930

Species brought into synonymy
 Lamprocystis annamitica Möllendorff, 1898: synonym of Microcystina annamitica (Möllendorff, 1898) (original combination)
 Lamprocystis appendiculata Möllendorff, 1893: synonym of Microcystina appendiculata (Möllendorff, 1893) (superseded combination)
 Lamprocystis balabacensis E. A. Smith, 1895: synonym of Lamprocystis discoidea Quadras & Möllendorff, 1894 (junior synonym)
 Lamprocystis circumlineata Möllendorff, 1897: synonym of Microcystina circumlineata (Möllendorff, 1897) (original combination)
 Lamprocystis exigua Möllendorff, 1897: synonym of Microcystina exigua (Möllendorff, 1897) (original combination)
 Lamprocystis frivola (Pease, 1866): synonym of Kusaiea frivola (Pease, 1866) (superseded combination)
 Lamprocystis fruhstorferi Möllendorff, 1897: synonym of Microcystina fruhstorferi (Möllendorff, 1897) (original combination)
 Lamprocystis fulgida Godwin-Austen, 1907: synonym of Ovachlamys fulgens (Gude, 1900) (junior synonym)
 Lamprocystis lissa E.A. Smith, 1894: synonym of Westracystis lissa (E. A. Smith, 1894) (original combination)
 Lamprocystis nana Möllendorff, 1897: synonym of Microcystina nana (Möllendorff, 1897) (original combination)
 Lamprocystis palaensis (C. Semper, 1870): synonym of Kororia palaensis (C. Semper, 1870) (superseded combination)
 Lamprocystis pseudosuccinea Möllendorff, 1893: synonym of Kororia pseudosuccinea (Möllendorff, 1893)
 Lamprocystis radiatula Möllendorff, 1897: synonym of Helicarion radiatulus (Möllendorff, 1897) (original combination)
 Lamprocystis spadix Schmacker & Boettger, 1891: synonym of Chalepotaxis spadix (Schmacker & Boettger, 1891) (original combination)
 Lamprocystis st.-johni (Godwin-Austen, 1891): synonym of Macrochlamys sanctijohni (Godwin-Austen, 1891) (superseded combination)
 Lamprocystis subcicercula (Garrett, 1881): synonym of Lamprocystis venosa subcicerula (Garrett, 1881)
 Lamprocystis subcrystallina Möllendorff, 1893: synonym of Lamprocystis crystallina (Möllendorff, 1887) (junior synonym)
 Lamprocystis subglobosa Möllendorff, 1897: synonym of Microcystina subglobosa (Möllendorff, 1897) (original combination)
 Lamprocystis succinea (Pfeiffer, 1845): synonym of Lamprocystis pseudosuccinea Möllendorff, 1893: synonym of Kororia pseudosuccinea (Möllendorff, 1893) (misidentification)
 Lamprocystis vitreiformis Möllendorff, 1897: synonym of Microcystina vitreiformis (Möllendorff, 1897) (original combination)

References

 Nomenclator Zoologicus info

External links
 

 
Euconulidae
Taxonomy articles created by Polbot